"Something to Hold on To" is a single by the musician Trevor Rabin, released in 1989 through Elektra Records. The single contains two tracks from his fourth studio album Can't Look Away, with "Something to Hold on To" reaching No. 3 on the U.S. Billboard Mainstream Rock chart and its accompanying music video being nominated for Best Video, Short Form at the 1990 Grammy Awards.

Track listing

References

1989 songs
1989 singles
Elektra Records singles
Songs written by Trevor Rabin
Song recordings produced by Bob Ezrin
Works by Trevor Rabin